Gabriel Antonio José Pereira Villagrán (Montevideo, 17 March 1794 – 14 April 1861) was a Uruguayan politician who served as president first from 1838 to 1839, and again from 1856 to 1860.

He was Minister of Finance from 1830 to 1831. He served as the President of the Senate of Uruguay 1833–1834, 1836 and 1839.

References

1794 births
1861 deaths
19th-century Uruguayan people
People from Montevideo
Presidents of Uruguay
Presidents of the Senate of Uruguay
Ministers of Economics and Finance of Uruguay
Uruguayan people of indigenous peoples descent
Uruguayan people of Portuguese descent